Ecatepec (until August 25, 2008, called Tecnológico) is a station on Line B of the Mexico City Metro system.  It is in the Ecatepec de Morelos city in the State of Mexico adjacent to Mexico City. The station opened on November 30, 2000, under its original name, Metro Tecnológico. The station's icon was the emblem of the Tecnológico de Estudios Superiores de Ecatepec, whose facilities are located nearby. On 23 July 2008, Francisco Bojórquez Hernández, director of the Sistema de Transporte Colectivo Metro, and José Luis Gutiérrez Cureño, Ecatepec's municipal president, established an agreement to improve the security, quality, and efficacy of the services at the station. As part of their agreement, they decided to change the name and iconography of the station. On August 25, 2008, Metro Tecnológico was renamed Metro Ecatepec, after the neighborhood where it is located. The updated station logo shows a Mexica based icon of Ehecatépetl a mountain whose top is the god of wind Ehecatl.

Ridership

References

External links 

Ecatepec
Railway stations opened in 2000
2000 establishments in Mexico
Ecatepec de Morelos
Mexico City Metro stations outside Mexico City
Railway stations in Mexico at university and college campuses